Calle 13 is a Spanish pay television channel. Owned by Universal Studios Networks Spain, Calle 13 promotes itself as a channel of suspense and action.

Calle 13 (13th Street) was launched in 1999 and its schedule is made of TV series and movies of action, suspense, terror, mystery and science fiction, both Spanish and international, classic and modern. With the birth of sister channel Sci Fi Channel in June 2006, most of the science-fiction series Calle 13 used to show were moved to the new channel.

Programming
Grimm
Rookie Blue
Numb3rs
 All series in the Law & Order franchise.
The Closer
Person of Interest
The 4400
Alfred Hitchcock Presents
Andromeda  *
Blood Ties
Brimstone
Castle
Chuck
Columbo
El Comisario
Jericho
The Dead Zone *
The Event
Hercules: The Legendary Journeys and Xena: Warrior Princess  *
Homicide: Life on the Street
The Listener 
MacGyver
Monk
Murder, She Wrote
Mutant X
Nip/Tuck
Numb3rs
Policías, en el corazón de la calle
Profiler
Psi Factor: Chronicles of the Paranormal
Psych
Rizzoli & Isles
seaQuest DSV *
Serial Experiments Lain
Star Trek: Enterprise *
Starhunter
Third Watch
White Collar 
Witchblade

* Now on SYFY Universal

Sister channels
Syfy Universal (also known as Syfy, formerly Sci Fi Channel) is a Spanish pay television channel that was launched on 1 June 2006 and specialises in science fiction, fantasy, and horror shows and movies.

Other versions
This channel is also available in:
 13ème Rue is the French version, was launched in November 13, 1997
 13th Street is the German version
 13th Street Universal (Benelux) is the version for the Benelux

References

External links
 

Television stations in Spain
Television channels and stations established in 1999
1999 establishments in Spain

pt:Rua 13